The Diocese of Haimen is a Latin Church ecclesiastical territory or diocese of the Catholic Church located in Haimen (Nantong), China. It is a suffragan diocese in the ecclesiastical province of the metropolitan Archdiocese and Nanjing.

History
 August 11, 1926: Established as Apostolic Vicariate of Haimen (海门宗座代牧区), from the Apostolic Vicariate of Nanjing 南京
 April 11, 1946: Promoted as Diocese of Haimen 海門

Leadership
 Bishops of Haimen 海門
 Bishop Joseph Shen Bin (April 21, 2010–Present)
 Bishop Mark Yuan Wen-zai (1985 - 2007)
 Bishop Simon Chu Kai-min, S.J. (朱開敏) (April 11, 1946 – February 22, 1960)
 Vicars Apostolic of Haimen 海門 
 Bishop Simon Chu Kai-min, S.J. (朱開敏) (August 2, 1926 – April 11, 1946)

References

 GCatholic.org
 Catholic Hierarchy
 UCAN Diocese Profile

Roman Catholic dioceses in China
Christian organizations established in 1926
Roman Catholic dioceses and prelatures established in the 20th century
Religion in Jiangsu